is a Japanese golfer.

Ozaki was born in Kaiyō, Tokushima. He turned professional in 1977. He won 15 tournaments on the Japan Golf Tour and ranks 13th on the career victories list.

He is the brother of Masashi "Jumbo" and Naomichi "Joe", two prominent golfers on the Japan Golf Tour.

Professional wins (21)

Japan Golf Tour wins (15)

*Note: The 1985 Mizuno Open was shortened to 54 holes due to weather.

Japan Golf Tour playoff record (5–3)

Other wins (1)
1979 Hakuryuko Open

Japan Senior PGA Tour wins (5)
2006 PGA Philanthropy Rebornest Senior Open
2007 Japan PGA Senior Championship
2008 Fancl Classic
2009 Fancl Classic
2014 Komatsu Open

Results in major championships

Note: Ozaki only played in The Open Championship.
CUT = missed the half-way cut
"T" = tied

Team appearances
World Cup (representing Japan): 1985, 1988
Four Tours World Championship (representing Japan): 1985, 1986 (winners), 1987, 1989
Dunhill Cup (representing Japan): 1986, 1988

See also
Spring 1981 PGA Tour Qualifying School graduates
List of golfers with most Japan Golf Tour wins

External links
 

Japanese male golfers
Japan Golf Tour golfers
Sportspeople from Tokushima Prefecture
1954 births
Living people